This is a list of coats of arms of Serbia.

State

Present

Historical

Administrative divisions

Armorials

See also
Serbian eagle
Serbian cross